The 2003 Biathlon Junior World Championships was held in Kościelisko, Poland from February 5 to February 9 2003. There was to be a total of 16 competitions: sprint, pursuit, individual, mass start, and relay races for men and women.

Medal winners

Youth Women

Junior Women

Youth Men

Junior Men

Medal table

References

External links
Official IBU website 

Biathlon Junior World Championships
2003 in biathlon
2003 in Polish sport
International sports competitions hosted by Poland
2003 in youth sport